"Guilty" is a vocal duet between Barbra Streisand and Barry Gibb. The song was written by all three Bee Gees: Barry, Robin & Maurice Gibb. Released as a single from Streisand's 1980 album of the same name. "Guilty" peaked at No. 3 on the US Billboard Hot 100 chart and No. 5 on the adult contemporary chart. In the UK, the song reached No. 34 on the UK Singles Chart. The single was certified gold by the RIAA. In addition, "Guilty" won a Grammy Award in the category Best Pop Vocal Performance, Duo or Group. The song also appeared on the 2001 Bee Gees compilation, Their Greatest Hits: The Record.

Record World said that "Barbra's vocal glistens like an early morning dewdrop while Barry adorns with plush harmonies"

There is also a version by Tom Jones and Gladys Knight. It is also used in the films Madea's Witness Protection and Barb and Star Go to Vista Del Mar.

Personnel
 Barbra Streisand – lead vocals
 Barry Gibb – lead and backing vocals, guitar, 
Robin Gibb-backing vocals 
Maurice Gibb-backing vocals
Robert Stigwood-record producer
 George Terry – guitar
 Cornell Dupree – guitar
 Richard Tee – electric piano
 George Bitzer – electric piano
 Harold Cowart – bass
 Steve Gadd – drums
 Joe Lala – percussion
 Denise DeCaro – background vocals, vocal contractor
 Marti McCall – background vocals
 Myrna Matthews – background vocals

Charts

Weekly charts

Year-end charts

Certifications

Human Nature version

Australian band Human Nature, released a cover version of the song as the second single from their album Walk the Tightrope. It introduced rapper Kelly K.A.E. The song peaked at No. 33 in Australia.

Music video
A music video was released to promote the song; with the group and Kelly K.A.E. singing the song in a studio. At one point, you see them flicking through vinyl records, one of which is the album “Guilty” by Streisand.

Track listing
CD single
 "Guilty"
 "Guilty" (Instrumental)
 "When You Say You Love Me" (Ben Hudson Drums Mix)
 "Haunted"

Charts

Barry Gibb version

"Guilty" is a song originally recorded by Barry Gibb as a guideline to Barbra Streisand for her album Guilty. On which Gibb on guitar, Blue Weaver on keyboard and Albhy Galuten on synthesizer.

The demo however sounds like the others, and since Barry sings it in falsetto throughout he had probably not yet decided to make it a duet. (By contrast, parts of "What Kind of Fool" are natural voice.) It was said to have been the last song submitted for the album.

Personnel
Barry Gibb – vocals, guitar
Blue Weaver – keyboard
Albhy Galuten – synthesizer, drum machine

References

1981 singles
Barbra Streisand songs
Barry Gibb songs
Male–female vocal duets
Songs written by Barry Gibb
Songs written by Robin Gibb
Songs written by Maurice Gibb
Song recordings produced by Barry Gibb
Pop ballads
CBS Records singles
Columbia Records singles
Sony BMG singles
1980 songs
Song recordings produced by Albhy Galuten
2004 singles
Human Nature (band) songs
1980s ballads